Holovetsko may refer to the following places in the Lviv Oblast of Ukraine:

 Holovetsko, Skole Raion
 Holovetsko, Staryi Sambir Raion